Jane Chemutai Goin is a Kenyan news journalist from Nandi County. She works as a television reporter at Citizen TV. Her areas of interest include politics and current affairs.

Life and career 
Chemutai started as an intern at Kenya Television Network (KTN) where she became interested in political reporting. She then joined Capital FM as a reporter, and also worked for Media Max as a political reporter at K24 TV, before becoming a reporter for Citizen TV. 

She has published news stories for Citizen TV's news portal, focusing on political and health news.

Awards 
Presidential Awards  
On 1 June 2020 (Madaraka Day), Chemutai was among the journalists given a state commendation in helping the country and creating awareness regarding the coronavirus disease. The award, known as "Uzalendo Award" was given by President Uhuru Kenyatta while addressing the nation. He acknowledged Chemutai among the ten journalists who had spearheaded and exhibited great efforts during the COVID-19 pandemic.

References 

Living people
Kenyan women journalists
Kenyan journalists
Kenyan television journalists
Kenyan women television journalists
Year of birth missing (living people)